James Gourlay (30 October 1862 – 8 June 1926) was a Scottish footballer who played as an outside left.

Career
Born in Cambuslang, Gourlay played club football for Cambuslang (appearing in the 1888 Scottish Cup Final) and made one appearance for Scotland against Ireland in 1886 (a 7–2 victory in which he scored the last goal). He is often confused with another James Gourlay, also a Cambuslang player, who was capped for Scotland in 1888.

References

1862 births
1926 deaths
Scottish footballers
Scotland international footballers
Association football outside forwards
Cambuslang F.C. players
Sportspeople from Cambuslang
Road incident deaths in Scotland
Footballers from South Lanarkshire